SCB-125 was the United States Navy designation for a series of upgrades to the  of aircraft carriers planned by the Ship Characteristics Board and conducted between 1954 and 1959. These upgrades included the addition of an angled flight deck and other enhancements (such as with catapults and elevators)  aimed at improving flight operations and seakeeping.

Principal alterations

The SCB-125 modifications included
 Angled flight deck
 Enclosed hurricane bow
 Mirror landing system 
 Mark 7 arresting gear
 Primary Flight Control moved to aft end of island
 Air conditioning
 No 1 (forward) elevator lengthened (SCB-27C ships only)
 No 3 (aft) elevator moved from centerline to starboard deck edge (on SCB-27A ships; had been part of SCB-27C refits)

Program history

The SCB-125 upgrade program was first applied to the final three Essex-class carriers to undergo the SCB-27C modernization while they were still in the midst of their original refit.

Despite the drastic alteration of the carriers' appearance, the SCB-125 refit involved relatively little modification of the ships' existing structure compared to SCB-27, and took around six to nine months as against the approximately two years of the earlier program. The original SCB-27A vessels, which were fitted with a pair of H 8 hydraulic catapults, were not upgraded with the C 11 steam catapults fitted to their SCB-27C sister ships due to machinery space limitations. The SBC-27As also did not receive the enlarged No. 1 (forward) elevator installed in the 27C ships as part of SBC-125.

The first three 27C ships (Hancock, Intrepid and Ticonderoga) had had their No 3 elevators moved from the centerline to the starboard deck edge, in a position relatively far aft.  The next three (Shangri-La, Lexington and Bon Homme Richard), which underwent 27C and 125 concurrently, had the elevator relocated to a deck-edge position farther forward, and this location was used for the 27A ships as they in turn underwent SCB-125.

, the prototype for the SCB-27 conversion, was the final Essex to undergo SCB-125 conversion and as such, received further enhancements.  As a result of the addition of aluminum flight-deck cladding, Mk 7-1 arresting gear and more-powerful C 11-1 steam catapults to the standard SCB-125 modifications, Oriskany alone was referred to as a SCB-125A vessel. These changes also made Oriskany the only SCB-27A vessel to receive steam catapults.

Modified vessels
Source: www.history.navy.mil 

1 Lexington was redesignated CVA upon completion of SCB-27C/125

References

 Naval Historical Center page on SCB-125 program 

Essex-class aircraft carriers